The 2000 Guelph municipal election was held on November 13, 2000., in Guelph, Ontario, Canada, to elect the Mayor of Guelph, Guelph City Council and the Guelph members of the Upper Grand District School Board (Public) and Wellington Catholic District School Board. The election was one of many races across the province of Ontario.

Results
Names in bold denotes elected candidates. 
(X) denotes incumbent.

Mayor

Mayoral race

Ward 1

Ward 1 Councillor, 2 To Be Elected

Ward 2

Ward 2 Councillor, 2 To Be Elected

Ward 3

Ward 3 Councillor, 2 To Be Elected

Ward 4

Ward 4 Councillor, 2 To Be Elected

Ward 5

Ward 5 Councillor, 2 To Be Elected

Ward 6

Ward 6 Councillor, 2 To Be Elected

References

2000 Ontario municipal elections
2000